KFRR (104.1 FM) is a commercial alternative rock music radio station in Woodlake, California, broadcasting to the Fresno, California area. Its studios are located at One Putt Broadcasting in Downtown Fresno, across from the historic Warnors Theater, while the transmitter is at Eshom Point.

History

KFRR signed on the air in 1992 under the call letters of KFCL, as Fresno's first commercial classical music station. Two years later, the format was changed to adult contemporary with a change of call letters to KFRR K104-In-A-Row (where the station plays four songs in a row without commercial interruptions). The station had a huge amount of PR with giving away plastic "credit card style" cards which were branded with a unique number. The station would call out for a numbered card, and if that listener called in within 10 minutes, they'd receive a cash prize. If nobody called in, the cash prize amount would increase until someone won it. The called it the "Cash Call Jackpot". The jackpot always started at $104.01 when it was reset. The station's main competitor at this time was Cross Town KTHT (Mix 102.7).

In 1995, the format was changed again to a modern rock format branded as "New Rock 104" with the station slogan being "This Is Not For You". This was the first modern rock station in Fresno after the failed KKDJ "105.9 The Edge" changed formats. The new format played much of the New Wave 1980s hits (labeled as "Retro-Flashbacks"), as well as the new sound (at the time) modern rock format to include major artists such as Nirvana, Smashing Pumpkins, Jewel, and Counting Crows.

There was no competition in this market against the station until Cross-Town KVSR "Star 101" debuted as a modern adult contemporary format. While it played most of the artists KFRR played, it remained more towards the pop side of music whereas KFRR took a more rock approach. Shortly afterwards the competition increased yet again when Cross-Town KTHT flipped formats to KALZ as "Alice 102.7" to go up against KVSR as a modern adult contemporary format.

Soon after sign-on 1995, the station brought The Bob & Tom Show to Fresno. It was a horrible match. The Bob & Tom Show was really for an older audience. It was part of then-owner Mondosphere's greater plans.

In October 1995 Rob Frazier (aka Robnokshus) took over the morning show with Andy as his co-host. It replaced the Bob & Tom Show which was moved to Mondosphere's KJFX station where it fits perfectly with the audience and is still there today.

The Robnokshus Show was short lived however as on April 29, 1996, the station announced it was bringing The Howard Stern Morning Show to Fresno. The press conference which aired on the station featured a heated battle between Howard Stern and TV news reporter Michael Golden. Stern became angry because Michael Golden kept insulting Robyn, and Stern got so furious, he ended that press conference right then and there.

In August 1999, KFRR made some noticeable changes to their playlist format, adopting a harder rock style format that played well known rock "hits" over lesser known songs, also many artists that KFRR had played that were also heard on rival stations KVSR and KTHT such as Goo Goo Dolls, The Verve Pipe, Dave Matthews Band and so on were no longer played on KFRR. Instead, KFRR opted to play more songs that were heard on hard rock station KRZR. KFRR had also launched many branding commercials that poked fun of KRZR such as "the competition claims to have been on the air for 10 years...that sure is a long time to suck."

On April 20, 2001, they dropped Howard Stern for The Kevin and Bean Show. They also changed the name of the station to 104.1, dropping the name "New Rock 104", and replacing the station slogan officially with "The Valley's Alternative".

On January 3, 2005, Wilks Broadcasting announced it was purchasing KFRR, KJFX, and KTSX from Mondosphere Broadcasting with customary conditions and FCC approval (it was later approved).

On January 3, 2006, Kevin & Bean was replaced with the new Adam Carolla show that was created when Howard Stern's radio show ended and he went to Sirius Satellite Radio.

Signaling yet another shift in format, on Monday, September 10, 2007, KFRR changed their slogan to "104.1, It Just Rocks" featuring more 80s and 90s mainstream rock.

On February 19, 2009, it was announced that due to a format change on the parent radio station of the Adam Carolla Show, it would be cancelled as of February 20, 2009. KFRR continued to broadcast "best of" editions of the Adam Carolla Show, distributed by Westwood One, while an online poll and phone calls to KFRR were to determine what would be played on the station on weekday mornings. On April 20, 2009, it was announced that KFRR would again be broadcasting the Kevin and Bean Show from KROQ-FM in Los Angeles, starting with the Kevin & Bean Rewind, live broadcast started on May 4, 2009.

On October 13, 2010, reacting to the format change by a competitor Clear Channel's KRZR 103.7, which dropped rock to install the company's new 90s-focused "Gen-X rhythmic" format that became KFBT, KFRR began to focus into a broader rock stance, and dropped the syndicated Kevin & Bean morning show, thus they began playing more music.  As KFRR remains alternative rock per Nielsen BDS, Mediabase most recently moved it to the active rock panel.  It is currently one of two alternative rock station on Mediabase's active rock panel, the other being WTZR.  KFRR has since reverted to Mediabase's alternative rock panel as of March 2012.

On December 10, 2010, KFFR debuted The Morning After, a local morning show featuring Skippy, who was a fixture on KRZR afternoons before the format change.

On Tuesday, November 25, 2014, KFRR and sister stations KJFX and KJZN were purchased by One Putt from Wilks Broadcasting for $6.6 million. On January 30, 2015, the purchase was consummated.

Former airstaff & canceled shows
 Andy (Now program director at KSKS/Fresno and KATM/Stockton-Modesto)
 Carlota (now live on KOMP/Las Vegas & "voice-tracking" at KKBZ)
 Chenoa Estrada (weekends/overnights 1997–2001)
 Crissie the Goddess (Overnights 1996–1999)
 Don-O (Program Director 1994–1998)
 James (Local news during Howard Stern 1997–2000)
 Jason Lee (a.k.a. Jason Hurst, now PM Drive at KSKS in Fresno)
 Jeff Scott (local news & public affairs 1989–2003)
 "Rhino" (nights 2003–2005)
 Kevin & Bean Show
 Rob "The Bank" (weekends 1999–2000)
 Robin Lewis (Now Roller Derby star in Los Angeles)
 Roy the Rocket Boy (Now at Clear Channel Fresno)
 Russ Parsley (Weekends KFRR '94–'96 – Moved to KVSR Star 101 '96–'02) (Metro Traffic '02–'03 for KJFX, KABX  & as Craig Allen on KFRR)
 Shadowboy/ Phat Matt
 Spot's Outlaw 80s
 The Adam Carolla Show
 The Howard Stern Show
 The LoveSponge (Voice and Production Director, 1995–2003)
 The Real Bruce Wayne (Program Director 1998–2000, now at KRAB/Bakersfield)
 The Reverend
 Tyson "The Gimp"
 Kevin "Kozman" Koske (Nights/Music Director 1996, now doing afternoons at WTMX/The Mix in Chicago)

References

External links
KFRR official website

FRR
Radio stations established in 1992
Modern rock radio stations in the United States